Derbyshire County Cricket Club in 1965 was the cricket season when the English club Derbyshire had been playing for ninety-four years. It was their sixty-first season in the County Championship and they won seven championship matches and lost nine to finish ninth in the County Championship. It was the third season in which the Gillette Cup was played, and Derbyshire reached the second round.

1965 season

Derbyshire played 28 games in the County Championship, one match against the touring South Africans and one match against Oxford University.  They won nine first class matches, lost nine matches and drew twelve matches. They won their first round match in the Gillette Cup, but lost in the second round. Derek Morgan was captain.   Ian Hall scored most runs. Brian Jackson took most wickets for the club. 
 
Philip Russell and David Smith were both promoted from the second XI for games at the end of the season. Russell played steadily for the club for many years. Smith became a high scorer for the club over four later seasons.

Matches

First Class

Gillette Cup

Statistics

Competition batting averages

Competition bowling averages

Wicket Keeping
Bob Taylor	
County Championship Catches 76, Stumping 6   
Gillette Cup Catches  , Stumping

See also
Derbyshire County Cricket Club seasons
1965 English cricket season

References

1965 in English cricket
Derbyshire County Cricket Club seasons